Sundås battery (Norwegian Sundås batteri) is a defunct coastal artillery site located at Sundåsen in Stokke, Sandefjord, Norway. The fortifications were constructed in 1899 during turbulent times with Sweden during the Union between Sweden and Norway. It was part of the newly established Norwegian Coastal Artillery ("Kystartilleriet"). The fort was erected to keep potential enemies from entering Tønsberg by sea, and was also meant to protect the Marine harbor in Melsomvik village. Work on the fort began in 1897, and the forts at both Håøya Island and Sundåsen were completed in 1899. Trenches, commando posts, fencing, concrete gun pits, and other remains from the fort can still be seen at Sundås. The fort lies by the Tønsberg Fjord with surrounding views of Færder Lighthouse and islands such as Håøya, Tjøme, Veierland, and Nøtterøy. The cannons were dismantled by German occupational forces in 1942 during the German occupation of Norway and moved to other fortifications elsewhere in Norway. After the war, the battery reverted to the Norwegian Armed Forces who managed the property until 1962 when an agreement for maintenance and management was made with the municipality in return for public access. In 2005 the area was sold off to Stokke municipality.

The fortifications were originally constructed to protect the marine harbor in Melsomvik from a potential Swedish invasion. Views from the fort include the Tønsberg Fjord, the Swedish coastline in the east, and the Skrim mountains in the west.

See also
 Melsomvik
 List of forts in Norway

References

Stokke
Sandefjord
Forts in Norway
1899 establishments in Norway
Infrastructure completed in 1899
Military installations in Vestfold og Telemark